Svyato is a rural locality (a selo) in Fominskoye Rural Settlement, Gorokhovetsky District, Vladimir Oblast, Russia. The population was 8 as of 2010.

Geography 
Svyato is located 49 km southwest of Gorokhovets (the district's administrative centre) by road. Gorlovka is the nearest rural locality.

References 

Rural localities in Gorokhovetsky District
Gorokhovetsky Uyezd